8-Bit Rebellion! is the soundtrack album for the online video game of the same name, consisting of songs recorded by American rock band Linkin Park. It was released on April 26, 2010 via Warner Bros. and Machine Shop and produced by Mike Shinoda. This is the fourth soundtrack released by the band. The previous soundtrack Transformers: Revenge of the Fallen – The Score, released on June 12, 2009 in the UK and June 23, 2009 in the United States, was a collaborated film score album with music composer Steve Jablonsky for the 2009 Transformers sequel Transformers: Revenge of the Fallen.

Composition 
The soundtrack contains the 8-Bit remix/instrumental of some songs by the band recorded for their previous studio albums, such as Hybrid Theory (2000), Meteora (2003), and Minutes to Midnight (2007) with exception for the songs "Qwerty" from Linkin Park's sixth LP Underground EP LP Underground 6.0 (2006), "New Divide" from the second Transformers original motion picture soundtrack Transformers: Revenge of the Fallen – The Album (2009), and many songs recorded separately for the soundtrack which are not actually a song, after the eighth track. The unreleased studio recording of "Blackbirds" was released for the soundtrack separately as a song to be unlocked by playing the game.

The soundtrack also includes the original songs from their three previous studio albums, known as the "hi - res" (hi-resolution) for the soundtrack. Mark Wrong is the additional musician from tracks nine to twelve on the soundtrack's original track listing.

Track listing
The game includes 8-Bit and original versions of their major songs:

After beating the game and stopping PixxelKorp, the player unlocks a previously unreleased recorded song, titled "Blackbirds" along with its official music video. It can be listened to in the online video game. This song is also available on the iTunes Deluxe Edition of Linkin Park's fourth studio album, A Thousand Suns (2010).

Personnel
Linkin Park (for the Hi - res list)
 Chester Bennington – lead vocals
 Mike Shinoda – vocals, rap vocals, rhythm guitar, keyboards, producer
 Brad Delson – lead guitars
 Dave "Phoenix" Farrell – bass guitars
 Joe Hahn – turntables, sampling, programming
 Rob Bourdon – drums, percussion

Additional Personnel
 Mark Wrong - instruments

References

External links
 

Linkin Park albums
2010 soundtrack albums